Patel S.I.R. is a 2017 Indian Telugu-language action thriller film produced by Sai Korrapati on Varahi Chalana Chitram banner and directed by Vasu Parimi. The film features Jagapati Babu in the titular role whereas Aamani, Padmapriya, Tanya Hope as female leads and music composed by DJ Vasanth.

Plot
The film begins with the 60-year-old man Patel S.I.R. who resides with his blind granddaughter Yamini. He targets a kingpin DR / Devraj spreading drug traffic all over the country. He starts slaying his men Lala, Monti very brutally. A suborn cop A.C.P. Catherine, is appointed to catch hold of the homicide. In that process, she ascertain several interesting facts.

Patil S.I.R true shade is a highly decorated soldier Major Subhash Patel whose life-ambition is to move his son Vallabh in his footsteps. Anyhow, he aspires to become a doctor, much to his father's dismay, and is. Therefore, ordered out of the house. After a few years, when Patel's wife Bharathi is terminally ill, Vallabh returns with his wife Rajeswari / Raaji and children. Following, her death, Patel decides to reconcile with his son, so the family reunites. Everything is going well, unfortunately, there takes place a tragical twist when Vallabh rescues a journalist Ravi from being shot, who has a piece of crucial evidence against Devraj. Before his death, Ravi hands it over to Vallabh. So he, Raaji and their son has been slaughtered by DR. But Yamini is safeguarded by Patil leaving her blind. That's why Patel is taking revenge against D.R.’s gang. The rest of the story is about how Patel reaches his final target D.R. Will he is able to get his granddaughter's eyesight back? Where does ACP Viswas feature in this setup?

Cast

Jagapati Babu as Subhash Patel & Dr. Vallabh Patel (Dual role)
Padmapriya as Rajeswari / Raaji 
Tanya Hope as A.C.P. Catherine
Subbaraju as A.C.P. Viswas
Kabir Duhan Singh as Devraj / D.R.
Aamani as Bharathi
Master Charan Ram as Jr. Vallabh Patel and Bharath (Dual Role)
Posani Krishna Murali as Powder Pandu
Raghu Babu as Minister 
Subhalekha Sudhakar as Rao
Babloo Prithiveeraj as Monti
Prabhakar as Laala
Giridhar as C.I. Shekar Chandra 
Surya as Taxi Driver 
Thotapalli Madhu 
Sasidhar as Journalist Ravi
Baby Dolly as Yamini
Lahari Shari as Doctor

Soundtrack

Music composed by DJ Vasanth. Music released on Vel Records Company.

Reception 
A critic from The Times of India wrote that "Patel S.I.R. is definitely worth a watch".

References

2017 films
Indian action thriller films
2017 action thriller films
2010s Telugu-language films
Vaaraahi Chalana Chitram films